Yengi Qaleh-ye Shahrak (also Romanized as Yengī Qal‘eh-ye Shahrak; also known as Yengī Qal‘eh) is a village in Badranlu Rural District, in the Central District of Bojnord County, North Khorasan Province, Iran. At the 2006 census, its population was 131, in 27 families.

References 

Populated places in Bojnord County